Tamil Nadu does not recognise same-sex marriages or civil unions.

In April 2019, the Madras High Court ruled that transgender women may marry in Tamil Nadu under the federal Hindu Marriage Act, 1955, and directed the state government to register the marriage of a man and a transgender woman.

Legal history

Background
Marriage in India is governed under several federal laws. These laws allow for the solemnisation of marriages according to different religions. Every citizen has the right to choose which law will apply to them based on their community or religion. These laws are the Hindu Marriage Act, 1955 (HMA), which governs matters of marriage, separation and divorce for Hindus according to Hindu custom and rites, the Indian Christian Marriage Act, 1872, which regulates the marriage and divorce of Christians, the Muslim Personal Law (Shariat) Application Act, 1937, for matters concerning the marriage, succession and inheritance of Muslims, the Parsi Marriage and Divorce Act, 1936, concerning the marriage and divorce of Parsis, the Anand Marriage Act, 1909, concerning the marriage of Sikhs, and the Special Marriage Act, 1954 (SMA). The SMA allows all Indian citizens to marry regardless of the religion of either party. Marriages contracted under the SMA are registered with the state as a civil contract. The Act applies to partners of all religions or with no religious beliefs as well as to interfaith couples. None of these acts explicitly bans same-sex marriage.

On 14 February 2006, the Supreme Court of India ruled in Smt. Seema v. Ashwani Kumar that the states and union territories are obliged to register all marriages performed under the federal laws. The court's ruling was expected to reduce instances of child marriages, bigamy, cases of domestic violence and unlawful abandonment. Subsequently, the Tamil Nadu Legislative Assembly passed the Tamil Nadu Registration of Marriages Act, 2009, which was signed into law by Governor Surjit Singh Barnala in August 2009. The Act provides for the registration of all marriages "performed on and from the date of commencement of this Act". It created a Registrar of Marriages, which shall issue a marriage certificate upon reception of a memorandum of marriage filed by the spouses. The Registrar may refuse to issue the license if the parties fail to meet the requirements to marry under the national law of their religion or community. The Act defines marriage as "all marriages performed by persons belonging to any caste or religion under any law for the time being in force, or as per any custom or usage in any form or manner and also includes remarriage".

Arunkumar v. The Inspector General of Registration
On 22 April 2019, the Madras High Court ruled in Arunkumar v. The Inspector General of Registration that transgender women may marry under the HMA. The court ordered the state government to register the marriage of a man and a transgender woman, Shri Arunkumar and Ms. Srija, which had been performed in October 2018 in Thoothukudi in accordance with Hindu custom. The couple were issued a marriage certificate following the court ruling in May 2019. Following their marriage ceremony in October, the Registrar of Marriages had refused to certify the marriage and issue a license, arguing that the couple could not marry under the HMA and that the dictionary definition of bride excluded transgender women. The court ruled that the refusal to register the marriage discriminated on the basis of gender identity in violation of the Supreme Court's ruling in National Legal Services Authority v. Union of India. The court also discussed the story of Aravan in its ruling.

Non-legally recognised marriage ceremonies
A Tamil woman, Subiksha Subramani, married her Bangladeshi partner Tina Das in a traditional Tamil wedding ceremony in Chennai in September 2022. The marriage has no legal status in India, but Subramani said, "It was everything we dreamt of but never thought was possible. After years of soldering thorough and braving the taunts we are happy today that our loved ones are standing with us, cheering for us and performing every ritual according to our respective customs." The officiant who performed the ceremony said he had already performed several ceremonies for same-sex couples. A same-sex couple were married in a traditional Hindu ceremony near Salem in July 2022.

Marriages to Aravan
Every year, many Tamil transgender people meet in Koovagam to marry Lord Aravan, known locally as Koothandavar. The participants marry Koothandavar, thus reenacting an ancient story in the Mahabharata: "Aravan, the son of Arjuna and Nāga princess Ulupi, agrees to be sacrificed to goddess Kali so that the Pandavas can win the war against the Kauravas. His dying wish is that he is married. However, no one is willing to marry him since he will be sacrificed the next morning. So Krishna takes on female form as Mohini, weds Aravan – only to be widowed the morning after." Transgender people in Tamil Nadu are referred to as aravāṇi in reference to the story. Other characters in the Mahabharata epic changed their gender. For instance, Shikhandi, the sibling of Draupadi, changed gender to male in order to go to war; Arjuna spent the last year of a 13-year-exile as an eunuch named Brihannala; and Krishna as Mohini had a son named Ayyappan with Shiva.

Public opinion
According to a 2019 report titled "Politics and Society Between Elections 2019", published by the Azim Premji Foundation and Lokniti-CSDS, Tamil Nadu ranked third in the nation in terms of acceptance of same-sex unions, after Delhi and Uttar Pradesh.

See also
LGBT rights in Tamil Nadu
Recognition of same-sex unions in India
Supriyo v. Union Of India

Notes

References

Tamil Nadu
Politics of Tamil Nadu